Itching ears is a term used in the Bible to describe individuals who seek out messages and doctrines that condone their own lifestyle, as opposed to adhering to the teachings of the apostles. The term is found only once in the Bible, in 2 Timothy 4.

Greek context
The phrase from which itching ears originates in the original Greek is κνηθόμενοι τὴν ἀκοήν (knēthomenoi tēn akoēn). κνηθόμενοι, the translation for having an itching ear, is a present participle, signifying a present, continual action occurring.

ἀκοήν translates to ear, or a sense of hearing. The use of ἀκοήν is often regarding an inner spiritual hearing. In , ἀκοὴ (Greek root) is used as the act of hearing, and is described as an action caused by faith (πίστις).

Paul the Apostle wrote 2 Timothy for Timothy to exhort him during his ministry. Within the context of chapter 4, verse 2, Paul charges Timothy to preach (κήρυξον), be ready (ἐπίστηθι), correct (ἔλεγξον), rebuke (ἐπιτίμησον) and exhort (ἐπιτίμησον). Each charge is an active verb in the aorist imperative tense, which implies that Paul is making a declarative, strong statement to Timothy.

Paul continues in chapter 4 verse 3 by describing a time when people will not listen to sound doctrine. Paul uses the phrase for a time will come (ἔσται) which translates more closely to there will be. ἔσται is a third person indicative verb in the future tense, which signifies a warning for Timothy that the Church of Christ on earth will not change for the better.

Paul's purpose
Paul describes the future that Timothy will face, where people would not endure sound doctrine, and instead heap to themselves teachers in order to satisfy their itching ears. Albert Barnes writes on this subject:
{{blockquote|The apostle here says, that by turning away from Timothy, and from sound instruction, they would not abandon all religious teachers, but would rather increase and multiply them." }}

Paul warns Timothy about a future apostasy in which the lusts of people would drive them away from Apostolic teaching, which Timothy belonged to. Charles Ellicott suggests a motive for doing so:

Paul's analogy
Paul uses the analogy of having an itching ear to show that pupils, not the teachers are the ones seeking doctrine aside from Apostolic teaching. Matthew Poole describes the cause and effect of an itching ear:

In chapter 4 verse 4, Paul writes:

Paul uses the word fables (μύθους) to describe the remedy that people seek in order to scratch their itching ears.

However, Paul continues to fulfill the analogy in chapter 4 verse 5 by contrasting Timothy's ministry from these fables. Paul calls Timothy to do the work of an evangelist'' by winning back those who sought fables, through preaching "the great facts of the Gospel placed side by side with the fables of the false teachers."

References

New Testament words and phrases
Pastoral epistles